This page details the team and NFL records for the Jacksonville Jaguars American football team.

Single-season records
Passing
 Attempts: 606, Blake Bortles (2015)
 Completions: 387, Trevor Lawrence (2022)
 Completion percentage (200+ attempts): 66.3%, Trevor Lawrence (2022)
 Yards: 4,428, Blake Bortles (2015)
 Rating (200+ attempts):  102.2, David Garrard (2007)
 Touchdowns: 35, Blake Bortles (2015)
 Interceptions: 20, Mark Brunell (1996)
 Least interceptions (200+ attempts):  3, David Garrard (2007)

Rushing
 Attempts: 345, Fred Taylor (2003)
 Yards: 1,606, Maurice Jones-Drew (2011)
 Average yards per attempt (100+ attempts): 5.7, Maurice Jones-Drew (2006)
 Touchdowns: 15, Maurice Jones-Drew (2009)

Receiving
 Receptions: 116, Jimmy Smith (1999)
 Receiving yards: 1,636, Jimmy Smith (1999)
 Receiving touchdowns: 14, Allen Robinson (2015)

Kicking
 Field goals: 33, Josh Lambo (2019)
 Field goal percentage: 97.1%, Josh Lambo (2019) 
 Longest field goal: 59 yards, Josh Scobee (2010), Josh Lambo (2019)

Kick/Punt returning
 Longest kick return: 102 yards, Jamal Agnew (2021)
 Longest punt return:  91 yards, Keelan Cole (2020)
 Kick return touchdowns:  1, Jimmy Smith (1995), Reggie Barlow (1997), Alvis Whitted (1999), Elvis Joseph (2001), Derrick Wimbush (2005), Maurice Jones-Drew (2006 & 2007), Marqise Lee (2016), Jamal Agnew (2021)
 Punt return touchdowns:  1, Reggie Barlow (1998 & 1999), Bobby Shaw (2002), Mike Thomas (2010), Rashad Greene (2015), Jaydon Mickens (2017), Dede Westbrook (2018), Keelan Cole (2020)

Team records
Passing
 Attempts: 3,616, Mark Brunell (1995–2003)
 Completions: 2,184, Mark Brunell (1995–2003)
 Yards: 25,698, Mark Brunell (1995–2003)
 Touchdowns: 144, Mark Brunell (1995–2003)
 Interceptions: 86, Mark Brunell (1995–2003)
 Rating (500+ attempts):  93.1, Gardner Minshew (2019–2021)
Rushing
 Attempts: 2,428, Fred Taylor (1998–2008)
 Yards: 11,271, Fred Taylor (1998–2008)
 Touchdowns: 68, Maurice Jones-Drew (2006–2013)

Receiving
 Receptions: 862, Jimmy Smith (1995–2005)
 Yards: 12,287, Jimmy Smith (1995–2005)
 Touchdowns: 67, Jimmy Smith (1995–2005)

Defense
 Sacks: 55, Tony Brackens (1996–2003)
 Interceptions: 30, Rashean Mathis (2003–2012)
 Interception touchdowns: 3, Rashean Mathis (2003–2012)
 Fumble touchdown returns:  2, Aaron Beasley (1996–2001)

Kicking
 Field goal attempts:  291, Josh Scobee (2004–2014)
 Field goals made: 235, Josh Scobee (2004–2014)

Kick/Punt returning
 Kick return touchdowns:  2, Maurice Jones-Drew (2006–2013)
 Punt return touchdowns:  2, Reggie Barlow (1997–2000)

Firsts
 First win:  vs. Houston Oilers 10/1/95
 First touchdown:  Steve Beuerlein (QB) to Randy Jordan (RB), vs. Cincinnati Bengals 9/10/95 
 First passing/receiving touchdown: Steve Beuerlein (QB) to Randy Jordan (RB), vs. Cincinnati Bengals 9/10/95 
 First rushing touchdown:  Mark Brunell, vs. Cincinnati Bengals 9/10/95
 First fumble returned for a touchdown:  Chris Hudson vs. Tennessee Oilers 11/2/97
 First interception returned for a touchdown:  Mickey Washington, vs. Cleveland Browns 10/22/95
 First kick return for a touchdown:  Jimmy Smith, vs. Denver Broncos 12/3/95
 First punt return for a touchdown:  Reggie Barlow, vs. New England Patriots 12/7/97
 First 3,000 yard passer in a season:  Mark Brunell, 1996
 First 1,000 yard rusher in a season:  Fred Taylor, 1998
 First 1,000 yard receiver in a season:  Jimmy Smith (1,244), Keenan McCardell (1,129), 1996

Jacksonville
Records